Julius Brewster Cotton (born February 16 in Brooklyn, New York) is a professional dancer with El Taller Coreografico in Mexico City, Mexico.  He is also a professor of dance at the University of the Americas in Puebla, Mexico.

Biography 
Brewster Cotton  was born Julius Brewster Jr., to Denise Grant (Brooklyn, New York) and Julius Brewster (Brooklyn, New York). He attended the Fiorello H. LaGuardia High School of Music & Art and Performing Arts in Manhattan.  He began his professional dance career in Ohio with the Dayton Contemporary Dance Company after graduating from Southern Methodist University in Dallas, Texas, in 2000.

In 2007 Brewster was awarded the Josie Award for Best Male Dancer in Dayton, Ohio.

In 2007 he moved to Mexico City, Mexico, to dance with the Tania Perez-Salas Dance Company. After artistic differences, however, he left the company and joined El Taller Coreografioco de la UNAM in 2008, under the direction of Gloria Contreras, also in Mexico City.

Brewster was the first African American to join the company in its 40-year history.

References

African-American male dancers
African-American dancers
American male dancers
Living people
1978 births
21st-century African-American people
20th-century African-American people